Reform Scotland is a Scottish think tank based in Edinburgh. Established in 2008, Reform Scotland is the successor to think tank Policy Institute (1999–2008).

Reform Scotland is a company limited by guarantee (No SC336414) and a Scottish charity (No SC039624) funded by individuals, charitable trusts, companies and organisations that share its aims.

Reform Scotland made a submission to the Scotland Bill Committee, based upon their pamphlet advocating Devolution Plus. Devolution Plus is a system whereby the Scottish devolution settlement would be amended to see both the Scottish Parliament and Westminster parliament raising sufficient revenue in taxation to fund their own spending. That submission was the basis of the foundation of the Devo Plus group, to promote the idea during the run up to a referendum on Scottish independence.

In 2012 Reform Scotland won 'one to watch' at Prospect magazine's annual think tank awards in London as well as runner up in the economic and financial category.

Key members of staff
 Chris Deerin, Director (Scotland Editor for the New Statesman, former Head of Comment at The Telegraph, former Executive Editor of Scotland on Sunday, former Daily Mail columnist).<
 Alison Payne (née Miller), research director (former political adviser to Scottish Conservatives leader Annabel Goldie, former head of research for the Scottish Conservatives, unsuccessful Conservative candidate for Portobello/Craigmillar in the 2007 Scottish local elections).

Trustees

The trustees of Reform Scotland are:

 Jack McConnell, Chairman
 Geraldine Gammell
 Sinclair Dunlop
 Kevin Pringle
 Sandy Kennedy

Previous trustees of Reform Scotland included:

 Alan McFarlane, Chairman
 Isobel d'Inverno
 Siobhan Mathers

References

External links
 Official website

Organisations based in Edinburgh
Political and economic think tanks based in the United Kingdom
2008 establishments in Scotland
Think tanks based in Scotland
Charities based in Edinburgh
Think tanks established in 2008
Private companies limited by guarantee of Scotland